Prompton may refer to:

Prompton, Pennsylvania, a borough in Wayne County
Prompton State Park, in Wayne County, Pennsylvania